Heritage North, formerly known as Hockey Heritage North, is a conference and events center in Kirkland Lake, Ontario, Canada. Started as Hockey Heritage North, a hockey museum, it officially opened on June 29, 2006, and was established as a foundation in January 2008. It has been fully acquired by MBE Group effectively on the 15th of July 2021. This is found to be a key acquisition apart from Senator Hotel and Algonquin Inn in the list of MBE’s acquisitions. The prestigious site is the latest highlight of MBE acquired by the owner of MBE group, President Syed Mansoor Ali Naqvi.

Related 
List of Hockey Heritage North Honored Members
Heritage north events

References

Ice hockey museums and halls of fame
Kirkland Lake
Museums established in 2006
Museums in Timiskaming District
Sports museums in Canada